Md. Waheduzzaman Sarkar is a Jatiya Party (Ershad) politician and the former Member of Parliament of Gaibandha-1.

Career
Sarkar was elected to parliament from Gaibandha-1 as a Jatiya Party candidate in 1996.

References

Jatiya Party politicians
Living people
7th Jatiya Sangsad members
Year of birth missing (living people)